Sapol Assawamunkong (also known as Great, born 6 December 1993) is a Thai actor, model, MC and singer. He is known for his roles in the film Inhuman Kiss, and drama Rak Wan Ban Wun (2018), Song Naree (2019) and Manner of Death (2020).

Early life and education 
Sapol Assawamunkong was born on 6 December 1993 in Bangkok, Thailand. He graduated high school from Bodindecha School (Sing Singhaseni). He hold a bachelor's degree in the Department of Technology Management from Sirindhorn International Institute of Technology.

Career
He began his entertainment career in 2015. He competed in The Cleo Most Eligible Bachelor 2016 competition and won the first prize.

He made his acting debut with the 2015 drama Room Alone 2, playing Key. In 2017, he played a supporting role in the drama  Bangkok Love Stories: Please. In 2018, he signed a contract for 5 years with the Channel 7 and starred in the drama Rak Wan Ban Wun where he reprised his role as Saoek as the male lead. He then starred in drama Jao Sao Chang Yon in the same year.

In 2019, he made his big-screen debut as a main role with the popular romantic horror film Inhuman Kiss. In the same year, he starred as a main role in the drama Song Naree.

In 2010, he played the supporting roles in several drama Tawan Arb Dao, Prom Pissawat, Rahut Rissaya, and Manner of Death. He received positive reviews for his portrayal of Inspector M in the Manner of Death which led to increased popularity for him. He released a duet with Kao Noppakao titled "Too Little, Too Late" (คิดได้) under the 'Boyfriends' project in September 2020.

Personal life
He is a Blink and popular fanboy of Lisa.

Filmography

Film

Television

Short series

Music video appearances

Discography

MC
 Television 
 2017 : SPOTLIGHT ON TV On Air Ch.7 (2017-2018)
 2019 : เส้นทางบันเทิง On Air Ch.7 (2019)

 Online 
 2022 : On Air YouTube:Great SAPOL

Awards and nominations

References

External links 
 

1993 births
Living people
Sapol Assawamunkong
Sapol Assawamunkong
Sapol Assawamunkong
Sapol Assawamunkong
Sapol Assawamunkong
Sapol Assawamunkong
Sapol Assawamunkong
Thai television personalities
Sapol Assawamunkong